Jeannou Lacaze, was a French Général d'armée of the French Army and Chef d'État-Major des armées (1981-1985), who also served in the French Foreign Legion.

Biography

Preliminary years 
Jeannou Lacaze was born in French Indochina, the son of a colonial functionary and an annamite of Chinese origin. He studied in a French school in Bordeaux.

Military career

1944 to 1950 
At the age of twenty, in 1944, he joined the French Forces of the Interior FFI and participated to the liberation. Received at Saint-Cyr in 1945, he pursued the infantry school application at Auvours where he graduated in 1947.

Detached at from his commencement, he was assigned to the 1st Foreign Infantry Regiment at Kef in Tunisia, he then joined the 2nd Foreign Infantry Regiment 2e REI in Indochina, where he served until 1951. Section chief of the 3rd battalion, he was severely wounded at the head of his section during an assault on the village of Ho Chi Minh, on 5 January 1948. Repatriated sanitary, he returned to the 2nd Foreign Infantry Regiment 2e REI and was deployed for a second tour in Indochina War.

1951 to 1979 
Returned to France in 1951, he was assigned to the Moroccan Tirailleurs Regiment. Following an assignment at the technical section of the French Army, he assumed command of the 129th Line Infantry Regiment in 1958 in Algeria.

In 1959, he was assigned the 11e Régiment Parachutiste de Choc.

Following a passage at the war school, he assumed command of the 2nd Foreign Parachute Regiment 2e REP after colonel Paul Arnaud de Foïard (regimental commander of the 2e REP in 1965) on 18 July 1967. He led his regiment to Tchad during Opération Épervier in 1969. He operated equally in Togo and in the Ivory Coast, in order to ensure the permanence of the « pré carré » of France in Africa.

Having left the French Foreign Legion, je joined the secret service before assuming command of the 11th Parachute Division from 1977 to 1979. During his commandment, the 2nd Foreign Parachute Regiment 2e REP intervened in Kolwezi in Zaire, and the French Army launched exterior theatre operations in Lebanon and Mauritania.

1980 to 1985 
He won the confidence of the President of France Valéry Giscard d'Estaing who named him Military governor of Paris in 1980, and Chief of the general staff headquarters of the Armies on 1 February 1981, a couple of months before the election of François Mitterrand. The new President maintained him in his post until his legal retiring age at retirement in 1985, while he totalized forty one years of service.

Titular of the Volunteer combatant's cross and the Combatant's Cross, général Jeannou Lacaze is a Grand Officer of Légion d'honneur. He is decorated with the Cross for Military Valour with three stars and the Croix de guerre des théâtres d'opérations extérieures with one palm and two stars.

1986 to 2005 
In 1986, he became the special counselor near the ministre français de la Défense for the military relations with the African countries having signed defense accords. He became the counselor of the several African Presidents : (Mobutu Sese Seko, Denis Sassou Nguesso and Félix Houphouet-Boigny) He went several times to Iraq before the Invasion of Kuwait in 1991 to sustain the promotion of French armament and French savoir-faire to the regime of Saddam Hussein.

He acted as a "character witness" during the trial of mercenary Bob Denard in 1999.

In 1989, he launched himself into politics. He exercised as well the honorary presidency association Paris solidarité métro (struggle against social exclusion). He was surnamed the « le sphinx », from the fact that barely rarely spoke and kept numerous intelligences from him. In 1995, he founded the Franco-Iraqi commercial Council, for armament promotion to Saddam Hussein.

He died on Monday 1 August 2005 at the age of 81, his funeral procession took place on 4 August in the cours d'honneur at Les Invalides in Paris.

Recognitions and Honors 
  Grand Officier of the Légion d'Honneur
  Grand Officier de l'ordre national du Mérite
  Volunteer combatant's cross
  Croix de guerre des théâtres d'opérations extérieures
  Combatant's Cross
  Croix de la Valeur Militaire
  Medaille d'Outre-Mer (clasps « Lebanon », « Tchad » )
  Médaille commémorative de la campagne d'Indochine
  Médaille commémorative des opérations de sécurité et de maintien de l'ordre en Afrique du Nord

Jeannou Lacaze was cited 6 times out of which one was at the orders of army. He is also the author of a book that appeared in 1991 "Le Président et le champignon" (The President and the "Mushroom"), where he exposed his conception of the defense of France, after the fall of communism.

References 

1924 births
2005 deaths
People from Thừa Thiên-Huế province
French generals
Officers of the French Foreign Legion
French military personnel of the First Indochina War
Military governors of Paris
National Centre of Independents and Peasants politicians
MEPs for France 1989–1994
Grand Officiers of the Légion d'honneur
Grand Officers of the Ordre national du Mérite
Recipients of the Croix de guerre des théâtres d'opérations extérieures
Recipients of the Cross for Military Valour
French people of colonial Vietnam